The following page lists all power stations in Rwanda. The country is in the midst of a rapid expansion of its electrical grid and many new plants are proposed or under construction. Rwanda is planning to expand its grid power up to 556 MW in 2024. , the national installed generation capacity totaled 276.068 megawatts. with peak demand of 140.6MW.

Hydroelectric

Operational

Proposed

Thermal

Operational

Proposed

Solar

Operational

See also 

 Energy in Rwanda
 List of largest power stations in the world
 List of power stations in Africa

References

External links
Rwanda’s power costs set to decline
East Africa Speeds Up Energy Projects
Kivuwatt

Rwanda
 
Power stations